The Battle of Summa was fought between the Soviet Union and Finland, in two phases, first in December 1939 and then in February 1940. It was part of the Winter War and was fought near the village of Summa (now Soldatskoye) along the main road leading from Leningrad to Viipuri.

First battle in December 

The village of Summa was a gateway to the city of Viipuri. The Finns had built 41 reinforced concrete bunkers in the Summa area, and the defense line was stronger than elsewhere in the Karelian Isthmus. However, the Finns had made mistakes in planning and nearby Munasuo swamp, east of Summa, had a kilometer wide gap in the line. At least 20 tanks drove through the line in the first day of battle, but the Soviets did not have proper co-operation between branches of service; tanks, artillery and troops fought their own battles. The Finns stood still in trenches and allowed the Soviet tanks to move behind the defense line on December 19th, as they did not have proper anti-tank weapons. After that the Finns repelled the Soviet main troops. Soviet tanks cut-off behind the line aimlessly attacked Finnish strongpoints, but once these were eliminated the threat was over. The Finns won the battle on 22 December.

Second battle in February 

As the Soviets found it too difficult to breach the line at the Summa sector, they attacked 10 km to the east in a sector known as Lähde. If they broke through there then they could encircle the Finns holding the Summa position. Timoschenko knew he could beat the Finns in a battle of attrition. His plan was to wear them down and go for an intense final attack.

First large probing actions were launched against the Finnish lines. For over ten days the line held every position. On 11 February, the Soviets began their major assault.

On 12 February, a minor breach in the Finnish lines in the Lähde sector led to disaster. By that time, so many breaches had occurred in the Mannerheim Line that the reports concerning them were virtually disregarded.  The following morning, a Finnish counter-attack was supposed to be launched by the entire 5th Division, the only reserve in easy reach of the front-line, but only one of the three regiments was available as the other two regiments had to be dispatched elsewhere.

Only two Finnish battalions launched a counter-attack against two well supplied Soviet regiments that were equipped with armor and artillery. The attack was thrown back with heavy Finnish casualties. The Soviets made efforts to exploit this prominently. One tank regiment proceeded as far as the Lähde road junction but then halted. Although complete victory was in their grasp, the Soviets stopped their armoured spearhead.

Many Finnish companies were reduced to half their original strength. One company had lost 86 out of 110 men. Over-night from the 14th to the 15th, the Finns began withdrawing from the Summa position. On the morning of the 15th the Soviets attacked an empty position at Summa with more than 100 tanks and two divisions. That afternoon, Mannerheim ordered a general retreat to the Intermediate Line.

See also 

 List of Finnish military equipment of World War II

 List of Soviet Union military equipment of World War II

References

Battles and operations of the Winter War
1940 in Finland
December 1939 events
February 1940 events